Coleochloa is a plant genus in the family Cyperaceae. It is found in sub-Saharan Africa and on the Island of Madagascar.

Coleochloa abyssinica (Hochst. ex A.Rich.) Gilly - eastern and central Africa from Ethiopia west to Nigeria and south to Angola
Coleochloa domensis Muasya & D.A.Simpson - epiphyte from Cameroon
Coleochloa glabra Nelmes - Jebel Oda Mountain in northeastern Sudan
Coleochloa microcephala Nelmes - Mt. Sanje in Tanzania
Coleochloa pallidior Nelmes - Malawi, Mozambique, Zimbabwe, Northern Province of South Africa 
Coleochloa schweinfurthiana (Boeckeler) Nelmes - Jebel Bangenze of Sudan
Coleochloa setifera (Ridl.) Gilly - from Tanzania and Zaire south to South Africa; also Madagascar

References

External links 

Cyperaceae
Cyperaceae genera
Flora of Africa
Taxa named by Charles Louis Gilly